The Cape or southern grysbok (Raphicerus melanotis) is a small antelope that is endemic to the Western Cape region of South Africa between Albany and the Cederberg mountains.

Description

It has a rough, reddish sandy coat flecked in white. The head, neck and legs are less flecked and somewhat yellowish, while the inside of the ears, eye-rings, mouth area, throat and underside are white. There is a black "bridge" to the nose and a dark scent gland in front of the eye. It stands only 21" (45–55 cm) at the shoulder and weighs slightly more than 20 pounds (8–12 kg). The short tail of the Cape grysbok measures 4 to 8 cm and is almost invisible. Males have short, sharp and straight horns about 8 cm long, which are smooth. The Cape grysbok can fluff out the fur at its rear end to make itself look bigger.

Habitat
The Cape grysbok's native habitat is the "Fynbos biome" (Cape Floristic Region), and it inhabits thick shrubland. It can sometimes be found browsing orchards and vineyards. In the Cape Peninsula the grysbok can be found in urban edges close to human activity. It may also be found in reed beds and along the riverbed of the southern Karoo.

Habits
The Cape grysbok is probably territorial as sightings are mostly of individual animals. It is a browser. It can apparently go without drinking water for long periods, gaining most of its requirements from its food. It is primarily nocturnal, though it may be seen during early morning and late evening during the southern winter. Like Sharpe's grysbok they use a communal latrine and mark plants in its vicinity with secretions from their pre-orbital glands. It defends itself by jumping forward toward its target then running away.

Breeding
Lambs are born in the southern summer after a gestation period of about 6 months. They stay hidden and grow fast.

Similar species
The similar Sharpe's grysbok (Raphicerus sharpei) can be found in south-eastern Africa.  The primary physical difference between the two grysboks is that Sharpe's has a pair of "false hooves" above the fetlocks.

Notes

References 
 Kingdon, Jonathan. 1997. The Kingdon Field Guide to African Mammals. Academic Press, San Diego & London. pp. 386–387.

External links 

 Photo of a Cape Grysbok

Endemic fauna of South Africa
Dwarf antelopes
Mammals of South Africa
Mammals described in 1811